State Road 238 (NM 238) is a  state highway in the US state of New Mexico. NM 238's southern terminus is at NM 529 west of Hobbs, and the northern terminus is at U.S. Route 82 (US 82) west of Lovington.

Major intersections

See also

References

238
Transportation in Lea County, New Mexico